The 1991 European Athletics Junior Championships was the eleventh edition of the biennial athletics competition for European athletes aged under twenty. It was held in Thessaloniki, Greece between 8 and 11 August.

Men's results

Women's results

Medal table

References

Results
European Junior Championships 1991. World Junior Athletics History. Retrieved on 2013-05-23.

European Athletics U20 Championships
International athletics competitions hosted by Greece
European Junior
Sports competitions in Thessaloniki
1991 in youth sport